Katherine Robinson  may refer to:

Katherine Robinson, character in Two Weeks with Love
Katherine Robinson (rower) in 2011 World Rowing Championships

See also
Kathryn Robinson (disambiguation)
Katie Robinson (disambiguation)
Kate Robinson (disambiguation)